The New Brandeis or neo-Brandeis movement is an antitrust academic and political movement in the United States that suggests that excessively centralized private power is dangerous for economically, political and social reasons. Also called hipster antitrust by its detractors, the movement advocates that United States antitrust law seek to improve business market structures that negatively affect market competition, income inequality, consumer rights, unemployment, and wage growth. 

The movement draws inspiration from the anti-monopolist work of Louis Brandeis, an early 20th century United States Supreme Court Justice who called high economic concentration “the Curse of Bigness” and believed monopolies were inherently harmful to the welfare of workers and business innovation.

The New Brandeis movement opposes the school of thought in modern antitrust law that antitrust should center on short-term price effects (as generally advocated by the Chicago school of economics). Instead, the New Brandeis movement advocates a broader antimonopoly approach that is concerned with the structure of the economy and market conditions necessary to promote vigorous competition.

Description 
The New Brandeis movement believes that centralized private power poses a danger to the economic and social conditions of democracy. Neo-Brandeisians believe, for example, that monopoly power is ripe with potential for abuse. They have also argued that dominant tech platforms create high barriers for potential competitors and reduce bargaining power of individual merchants, content providers, and app developers. The movement advocates for market structures that prevent anti-competitive practices and would increase scrutiny of mergers, including vertical mergers. Proponents believe antitrust laws should focus less on short-term price effects of mergers and more on improving the market conditions necessary to promote real competition.

Support and opposition 
Individuals who have been described as being associated with the movement include Lina Khan, Tim Wu, Jonathan Kanter, and Barry Lynn. Senators Cory Booker and Elizabeth Warren have been described as allies of the movement, and have called on the United States Department of Justice Antitrust Division and Federal Trade Commission to focus their enforcement efforts more on helping workers. The movement has since been the subject of both academic conferences, research papers, and academic journals.

Critics of the New Brandeis movement believe that promoting competition for its own sake causes inefficient producers to stay in business, preferring a litigation approach based on empirical evidence. The term "hipster antitrust" originally began as a Twitter hashtag, and rose to prominence when Senator Orrin Hatch used the term during multiple speeches on the United States Senate floor. Matt Levine of Bloomberg News has written that the term hipster antitrust "appeals to nostalgia for old-fashioned antitrust enforcement". Some proponents of the movement believe the term is pejorative. The term was coined by Konstantin Medvedovsky, an attorney at Dechert, and popularized by former Federal Trade Commissioner Joshua D. Wright.

History

Background 
As documented by historian Ellis Hawley, the original "NeoBrandeisian" movement arose in the late 1930s.  In reaction to the failures of the first New Deal a group headed by Harvard Professor Felix Frankfurter advanced ideas of economic decentralization and renewed antitrust enforcement.  These ideas came to be influential during the late 1930s and onward, during the so-called "Second" New Deal. Prominent individuals associated with the movement included Robert H. Jackson, Benjamin V. Cohen, William O. Douglas, and Thurman Arnold.

From World War II until the 1970s, the Brandeisian view that high market concentration leads to anticompetitive behavior was sometimes called the Harvard School of thought because the view was primarily associated with Harvard University, including works by economists Edward Mason, Edward Chamberlain, and Joe Bain. In the early late 1970s, this view fell out of favor as the views of the Chicago School of thought rose, advocating a close attention to the short term effects of mergers on consumer prices.

Development 
Emerging in the late 2010s, the movement takes inspiration from former US Supreme Court justice Louis Brandeis, who was a prominent anti-monopolist. Brandeis believed that antitrust action should prevent any one company from maintaining too much power over the economy because monopolies were harmful to innovation, business vitality, and the welfare of workers. He described "The Curse of Bigness," believing that large profitable firms use their money to influence politics and create further consolidation and dominance, once stating, “We can have democracy in this country, or we can have great wealth concentrated in the hands of a few, but we can’t have both.”

In the 2010s, the New Brandeis theory was popularized by legal scholars Lina Khan and Tim Wu, both of Columbia University.  Khan published an article about the negative effects of monopoly power by the company Amazon. The theory would heighten scrutiny of large company mergers.   Wu published "The Curse of Bigness: Antitrust in the New Golden Age" in 2018, which criticized antitrust's drift from its historic origins, introduced Brandeis' life and ideals, and advocated a return a more decentralized economy.   In 2019 Khan, Wu and others released a "Utah Statement" written at anti-monopoly conference meant as a codification of the movements' main principles.

Biden administration 
The movement was perceived to grow in influence during the Biden administration, as compared to the prior Trump and Obama presidencies.  The Wall Street Journal described the movement as "a new generation of trustbusters" in 2021, arguing that it represented a shift away from a singular focus on perceived consumer welfare that began with the Reagan administration and the ideas of Robert Bork.

In 2021, the White House appointed Tim Wu, a prominent member of the movement at Columbia, to serve as special assistant to the President for Competition and Technology policy. The President in July 2021 signed a new Executive Order of Competition, which called for a reinvigoration of competition policy across government.  Biden later nominated Jonathan Kanter, a neo-Brandeisian, to serve as assistant attorney general in the Department of Justice Antitrust Division. Kanter was confirmed by the United States Senate by a vote of 68–29 and took office in November 2021. Biden also nominated Lina Khan to be Chair of the Federal Trade Commission. On June 15, 2021, her nomination was confirmed by the Senate by a vote of 69 to 28. Khan was confirmed with bipartisan support.

References 

2010s in American politics
2020s in American politics
Political movements in the United States
Progressivism in the United States
United States antitrust law
Louis Brandeis